San Mateo Yucutindoo is a municipality in Oaxaca in south-western Mexico. Its seat is the town of Zapotitlán del Río. The municipality covers an area of 197.8 km². 
It is part of the Sola de Vega District in the Sierra Sur Region.

The municipality was originally incorporated as Zapotitlán del Río, and changed its name to San Mateo Yucutindoo by decree of Oaxaca's State Congress in 2012. 

As of 2020, the municipality had a total population of 3,144.

References

Municipalities of Oaxaca